Peter Machajdík  (born 1 June 1961) is a contemporary Slovak composer, sound and visual artist. He was born and grew up in Bratislava, Slovakia.

In the 1990s, he took part in seminars with Vinko Globokar, Karlheinz Stockhausen, Clarence Barlow, Konrad Boehmer, and others. In 1992, he was the guest of the DAAD Artists-in-Berlin Program.

Machajdik has composed music in nearly all genres, including orchestra, band, chorus, chamber music, works for solo instrument, works for piano and organ, as well as liturgical works and hymns. 

Moreover, he has created a number of graphic notations, including the Dialogue with... series which is based on letters received from composer colleagues with additional visual elements added. While in this series the written content of the letters may appear as audible text, other graphic notations are purely visual (like Wold). Others again contain notation or text describing elements to be performed (like Donauklang).

His music is published primarily by Musica Slovaca, Alea Publishing, Zimbel Press, and Edition Hudba.

Peter Machajdík's music often asks questions about the society in which we live. It calls for humanity and responsibility that human beings should have to each other and to the world. Machajdík's works, often considered as the counterpoint to the violence, intolerance, racism and greed of our age, are marked by a keen sensitivity to instrumental colour and texture. 

Machajdik's orchestral works have been premiered by the Janáček Philharmonic Orchestra, State Philharmonic Orchestra of Košice, Nordwestdeutsche Philharmonie, Pomeranian Philharmonic, Lugansk Symphony Orchestra, Slovak Radio Symphony Orchestra, Slovak Chamber Orchestra, Camerata Europea, Capella Istropolitana, Ensemble Metamorphosis, Cluster Ensemble, and many others. 
He has also worked with Jon Anderson from Yes, harpist Floraleda Sacchi, cimbalom virtuoso Enikö Ginzery, vocalist & drummer David Moss, conductors Benjamin Bayl, Anu Tali, Miran Vaupotić, Florian Ludwig, Pawel Przytocki, Gum Nanse, Przemysław Zych, clarinetists Martin Adámek and Guido Arbonelli, and violist Sasha Mirković.

Film credits include Machajdik's scores for 4 Schüler gegen Stalin (2005), Wild Slovakia (2015) and Miloš and the Lynxes (2010). Machajdik has worked with choreographers and dancers such as Dorothea Rust, Studio tanca, Petra Fornayova, Tina Mantel, Lucia Kašiarová, and others.

A vegetarian and teetotaler, Machajdík lives in Berlin, Germany, and in a little Slovak town situated in a valley, surrounded by lofty hills.    
He is currently Visiting Professor at the Faculty of Arts in Košice.

Selected works 
 Natural Harbors for violin, viola, cello, double bass and piano (2022) 15 minutes
 The Lost Blue - Still Connecting for flute, percussion (vib, crotales) and piano (2022) 14 minutes
 Quiet Differences for two guitars (2022) 7 minutes
 Converging Understandings for 2 flutes, 2 oboes, 2 clarinets, 2 bassoons, 2 horns (2022) 11 minutes
 Kryha for two accordions (2021)
 Planting for cimbalom (2021) 
 Da perenne gaudium for organ (2021)
 Passing Through Nothing for string quartet (2020) 10 minutes
 On Temperance for piano (2020)
 The Vanishing for 2 accordions and organ (2020) 12 minutes
 Sinaia Echoes for flute, percussion (vib, gong) and piano (2020) 15 minutes
 More Questions Than Answers for guitar (2020) 8 minutes
 Invisible Beings for string orchestra (2019)
 In der Essenz for flute, percussion (vib, trgl) and piano (2019) 5 minutes
 The Howling Glaciers for piano and accordion (2019)
 Gegen.Stand for accordion and orchestra (2019) 20 minutes
 Sacrifices for piano (2019)
 Déjà vu (Concertino for harpsichord and string orchestra) [1999, rev. 2019]
 Mornings for piano (2019)
 Terauchi for string quartet and audio-playback (2018) 10 minutes
 It's Not the Mist for two pianos (2018)  
 Zem for organ (2018)
 1-9-1-8 for violin and piano (2018)
 Signes de la mémoire for clarinet, violin, cello and piano (2017) approx. 8 minutes
 Wold [open instrumentation and duration assumed] (2017)
 Folium for piano and organ (2017) 10 minutes
 Guitar quintet The Son, for guitar and string quartet (2017) approx. 10 minutes
 In Embrace for double bass and piano (2017) approx. 11 minutes
 Mit den Augen eines Falken for mandolin and guitar (2017) approx. 11 minutes
 Behind the Waves for viola and string orchestra (2016) approx. 12 minutes
 Portus pacis for organ (2016) 9 minutes
 Abandoned Gates for piano and string quartet (2016) 13 minutes
 Seas and Deserts for string quartet and audio-playback (2015) 12 minutes
 Ich war in dir for soprano and cello (2015)
 Danube Afterpoint for piccolo, flute, clarinet, bass clarinet, two pianos and string quartet (2015) 15 minutes
 Effugium for accordion and audio-playback (2015) 8 minutes
 Senahh for flute and piano (2015)
 Green for accordion (2015)
 Spomaleniny for violin and piano (2014)
 Munk for viola and piano (2013)
 Silent Wanderings for guitar (2012) 5 minutes
 Wie der Wind in den Dünen for string orchestra (2011)
 The Immanent Velvet for piano (2011)
 Kyrie for mixed choir a cappella (SATB) (2011)
 Pictures of a Changing Sensibility for violin and piano (2011)
 Linnas for piano (2011)
 Domine for mixed choir (SATB) and tubular bells (2011)
 Flower full of Gardens for harp or harpsichord (2010)
 San José for large orchestra (2010)
 Zem zeme for clarinet quartet (2009)
 Water Forgives for cimbalom (2009)
 Concerto for 2 bayans and orchestra, dedicated to all of those who helped to remove „the iron curtain“ and the communistic regimes in the central part of Europe in the 1989 (2008) 
 On the Seven Colours of Light for organ (2007)
 Iese for flute solo (2007) approx. 5 minutes
 To the Rainbow So Close Again for string quartet (2004)
 Nell'autunno del suo abbraccio insonne for harp (2004)
 Obscured Temptations for piano (2003)
 Si diligamus invicem for mixed choir a cappella (SATB) (2002)
 Namah for string orchestra (2000)
 Lasea for string orchestra (2000)
 Kirin for oboe solo (1999/2001)
 Five Mirrors for accordion (1997)
 Wrieskalotkipaoxq for saxophone quartet (1996)
 Intime Musik [open instrumentation and duration assumed] (1994)

Music for theatre 
 Escaped Alone [music for the production of Caryl Churchill's play Escaped Alone under Eduard Kudláč's direction at the Slovak National Theatre] (2021)
 Niekto príde" (Nokon kjem til å komme) [music for the production of Jon Fosse's play Nokon kjem til å komme under Eduard Kudláč's direction at the Žilina Theatre] (2021)
 Bezzubata [music for the production of Miklos Forgacs's play Bezzubata under Eduard Kudláč's direction at the Žilina Theatre] (2019)

Sound Art and Graphic Notation 
 Donauklang [open instrumentation and duration assumed] (1989)
 Dialogue with Stockhausen [open instrumentation and duration assumed] [1984]
 Dialogue with Malcom Goldstein [open instrumentation and duration assumed] [1984]

Discography 
 1995: THE ReR QUARTERLY © QUARTERLY, ReR Volume 4 No 1 CD - ReR 0401 Recommended Records
 2003: NAMASTE SUITE (Guido Arbonelli - clarinets) © Mnemes HCD 102
 2008: NUOVE MUSICE PER TROMBA 6 (Ivano Ascari - trumpet) © AZ 5005
 2008: THE HEALING HEATING (R(A)DIO(CUSTICA) SELECTED 2008) © Czech Radio
 2008: NAMAH feat. Floraleda Sacchi, Jon Anderson, David Moss © musica slovaca SF 00542131
 2009: MINIMAL HARP (Floraleda Sacchi - harp). Works by Arvo Pärt, John Cage, Philip Glass, György Ligeti, Peter Machajdík, Lou Harrison, Nicola Campogrande) © DECCA / Universal 476 317
 2011: INSIDE THE TREE (Machajdík's music for cello, harp and electronics) © Amadeus Arte Catalogue No. AA11003
 2012: CZECHOSLOVAK CHAMBER DUO (Dvořák / Machajdík / Schneider-Trnavský) Czech Radio, Catalogue No. #CR0591-2
 2012: A MARVELOUS LOVE - New Music for Organ (Carson Cooman plays compositions by Peter Machajdík, Patricia Van Ness, Jim Dalton, Tim Rozema, Al Benner, Thomas Åberg, and Harold Stover), Albany Records, Catalogue No. TROY1357
 2012: THE IMMANENT VELVET (Machajdík's chamber music for piano, guitar, cello, harp and strings), Azyl Records, Catalogue No. R266-0024-2-331
 2015: ELEKTRICKÁ GITARA (Machajdík's 12-minute composition LET for electric guitar, and works by composers such as Luciano Berio, Daniel Matej, Boško Milaković, Juraj Vajó, Pavol Bizoň, Ivan Buffa), Hevhetia, Catalogue No. HV 0070-2-331
 2018: FRIENDS IN COMMON TIME (Works by Peter Machajdík, Tor Brevik, Francis Kayali, Adrienne Albert, Peter Kutt, Andre Caplet, Kevin W. Walker, Alexander Timofeev) Catalogue No. © Copyright - Rebecca Jeffreys (700261465210)
 2018: BIRDS (Finnish harpsichordist Elina Mustonen plays works by Peter Machajdík, François Couperin, Jean-Philippe Rameau, William Byrd, Olli Mustonen) © Fuga 9447,  EAN: 6419369094478
 2019: BOWEN-REGER-MACHAJDIK-BRAHMS (Ivan Palovič - viola and Jordana Palovičová - piano). Works by Peter Machajdík, Johannes Brahms, Max Reger a Yorka Bowen) © Pavlík Records

On the 2008 CD NAMAH, Machajdík worked with singer Jon Anderson from Yes, harpist Floraleda Sacchi, vocalist & drummer David Moss, clarinet virtuoso Guido Arbonelli, cello player Jozef Lupták, and others.

References

External links

Music Centre Slovakia (English)
DAAD
CD The Immanent Velvet
CD Namah
Graphic Notations
CD Minimal Harp
Jan Levoslav Bella Preis 2006
1992 electronic music presentation
Jon Anderson & Peter Machajdik "live"
The Healing Heating

Bibliography 
 Torsten Möller, Kunsu Shim, Gerhard Stäbler: SoundVisions (2005) - 
 Zuzana Martináková: Slovak Composers after 1900 (2002) - 
 Július Fujak: Musical Correla(c)tivity (2005) - 
 Michal Murin: Avalanches 1990-95 (2002) - 
 Marián Jurík, Peter Zagar: 100 slovenských skladateľov (1998) - 
 Slovenská hudba Slovenská hudba včera a dnes (1997) - 
 Július Fujak & kol. Slovenské hudobné alternatívy (2006) - 

20th-century classical composers
1961 births
Musicians from Bratislava
Living people
Slovak film score composers
21st-century classical composers
Composers for pipe organ
Male classical composers
Slovak composers
Male composers
20th-century male musicians
21st-century male musicians
Male film score composers
Musicians from Berlin
Slovak male musicians